Ansolabehere is a surname. Notable people with the surname include:

Stephen Ansolabehere, professor of government at Harvard University
Joe Ansolabehere (born 1959), American animation screenwriter

Basque-language surnames